The members of the Parliament of Fiji in 1987 consisted of members of the House of Representatives elected between 4 and 11 April 1987. However, Parliament was dissolved later in 1987 following a military coup.

House of Representatives

References

 1987